A Bachelor of Music (BMus) is an academic degree awarded by a college, university, or conservatory upon completion of a program of study in music. In the United States, it is a professional degree, and the majority of work consists of prescribed music courses and study in applied music, usually requiring proficiency in an instrument, voice, or conducting.

The degree may be awarded for performance, music education, composition, music theory, musicology / music history (musicology degrees may be a Bachelor of Arts rather than a Bachelor of Music), music technology, music therapy, sacred music, music business/music industry, entertainment, music production, or jazz studies. Since the 2010s, some universities have begun offering degrees in music composition with technology, which include traditional theory and musicology courses and sound recording and composition courses using digital technologies.

In the United Kingdom, the Bachelor of Music is generally a first degree lasting three years or four years and consisting of a wide range of areas of study (normally including performance, composition, music theory, musicology/music history), but at the University of Oxford and University of Cambridge it was a one-year postgraduate degree which could only be taken if a student were to have been a graduate in music with honors at those universities; the undergraduate course is in the Faculty of Arts and leads to the Bachelor of Arts (and subsequently the Master of Arts (Oxbridge)).

Abbreviations
After a degree holder's name, as on a business card or a CV, the degree is abbreviated in various ways, including: B.M., BM, B.Mus., BMus, Mus.B., or Mus.Bac. Some recipients add an abbreviation for the name of the institution which granted the degree as well, e.g., "Susan Bhattara, B.Mus. (Oxon)"; Oxon being the Latin abbreviation for Oxford University.

Post-graduation options
Graduates may apply for jobs in performance, teaching, or arts administration. As well, graduates can apply for jobs that require a bachelor's degree in any subject, such as some entry-level jobs in banking, insurance, sales, and administration. Graduates with an interest in teaching in the school system may go on to complete a teaching degree or diploma. Graduates who have achieved a high standard on their instrument, voice, or another specialization such as composition or conducting may be eligible to apply for a Master of Music (M.M.) if their grades are high enough (a B+ or A− average is typically required). B.M. graduates can also apply to a range of graduate programs outside of music, such as library science, business administration or public administration; a B+ or A− average is typically required. Some programs may require B.M. graduates to complete preparatory or make-up courses in the field of the master's. As well, some programs require the GRE or GMAT (standardized tests). B.M. graduates in some fields, such as composition, music theory, or musicology may be able to apply directly to Ph.D. programs if they have a high average and strong recommendation letters.

References

Music, Bachelor
Performing arts education
Humanities education
Music education